Schwein (German for pig as well as pork) is a music group comprising members of Buck-Tick, KMFDM, and PIG. Members Raymond Watts (vocals, programming, guitar) and Hisashi Imai (Buck-Tick; guitar and noise), both having worked together in Schaft, were joined by Atsushi Sakurai (Buck-Tick; vocals), Sascha Konietzko (KMFDM; vocals and programming) and Lucia Cifarelli (KMFDM; vocals). In 2001 Schwein released an album, Schweinstein, followed by the remix album Son of Schweinstein. Schwein toured Japan in the summer of 2001. However, Konietzko did not tour with them, citing illness and a desire to focus on KMFDM.

Discography

Studio album 
Schweinstein (2001)

Remixed album 
 Son of Schweinstein (2001)

Members

Official members 
Raymond Watts - guitars, programming, vocals (PIG, Schaft, KMFDM)
 Atsushi Sakurai - vocals (Buck-Tick)
 Imai Hisashi - guitars, noises (Buck-Tick, Schaft)
 Sascha Konietzko - programming, vocals, percussion (KMFDM)

Guest musicians 
 Lucia Cifarelli - vocals (KMFDM)
Jules Hodgson - guitars, bass, programming (KMFDM)
Chris Ignatiou - guitars (One Minute Silence)
Kazutoshi Yokoyama - Manipulate, Additional programming (Buck-Tick touring member)
Julian Beeston - Additional programming

Touring members 
Bryan Black - keyboards
Arianne Schreiber - backing vocals
Andy Selway - drums (KMFDM)

References 

KMFDM
Supergroups (music)
Japanese industrial music groups
German industrial music groups
Musical groups established in 2001